The Great Seal of the State of Kansas tells the history of Kansas.

The seal contains:
 Landscape with a rising sun (the east)
 River and steamboat (commerce)
 Settler's cabin and a man plowing a field (agriculture) [foreground]
 Wagon train heading west (American expansion / pioneer life)
 Indians hunting American Bison (the buffalo are fleeing from the Indians)
 Cluster of 34 stars (top of the seal) – identifying Kansas as the 34th state to be accepted into the Union of the United States.
 State motto "Ad Astra per Aspera" (Latin: "To the Stars through Difficulties")

The seal is used on the Flag of the State of Kansas.

History

The design for the Great Seal of Kansas was submitted by John James Ingalls, a state senator from Atchison. Ingalls also proposed the state motto, "Ad astra per aspera."

The Great Seal of the State of Kansas was established by a joint resolution adopted by the Kansas Legislature on May 25, 1861.

The resolution states:
"The east is represented by a rising sun, in the right-hand corner of the seal; to the left of it, commerce is represented by a river and a steamboat; in the foreground, agriculture is represented as the basis of the future prosperity of the state, by a settler’s cabin and a man plowing with a pair of horses; beyond this is a train of ox-wagons, going west; in the background is seen a herd of buffalo, retreating, pursued by two Indians, on horseback; around the top is the motto, 'Ad astra per aspera,' and beneath a cluster of thirty-four stars. The circle is surrounded by the words, "Great seal of the state of Kansas. January 29, 1861."

See also

List of Kansas state symbols

References

External links
The Great Seal of the State of Kansas

Symbols of Kansas
Kansas
Kansas
Kansas
Kansas
Kansas
Kansas
Kansas
Kansas
Kansas
Kansas